Frank Hodgetts (30 September 1924 – 27 March 2018) was an English footballer who played as a winger in the Football League. He holds the record for the youngest player to play for West Brom, making his debut at the age of 16 years, 26 days vs Notts County, 26 October 1940.

References
 https://web.archive.org/web/20130116060710/http://www.wba.co.uk/stats/in_the_record_book/

External links
Frank Hodgetts's Career

1924 births
2018 deaths
English footballers
Sportspeople from Dudley
Association football midfielders
West Bromwich Albion F.C. players
Worcester City F.C. players
Millwall F.C. players
English Football League players